Hamid Neshatjoo (born January 13, 1979) is an Iranian footballer who plays for Steel Azin F.C. in the IPL.

Career
Neshatjoo has spent his entire career with Steel Azin F.C.

Club Career Statistics
Last Update  13 December 2010

References

External links

1979 births
Living people
Futsal goalkeepers
Iranian footballers
Iranian men's futsal players
Steel Azin F.C. players
Association football goalkeepers
21st-century Iranian people